Christian Louis Ntsay (born 27 March 1961) is a Malagasy politician who is serving as the prime minister of Madagascar since 2018. He was appointed by President Hery Rajaonarimampianina following Olivier Mahafaly Solonandrasana’s resignation due to widespread protests throughout the country. Ntsay is considered a technocrat and has worked for the United Nations.

Political career

References

1961 births
Living people
Prime Ministers of Madagascar
People from Antsiranana